Xinhe County as the official romanized name, also formerly known as Toksu County it's Uyghur name. , is a county in Aksu Prefecture, Xinjiang Uyghur Autonomous Region, China.

Name
The county's original name Toksu was changed into Xinhe in 1941. "Xinhe" is the abbreviation of "Xinjiang Heping", literally "Xinjiang Peace."

History
On October 27, 1930, Toksu County was created from part of Kuqa.

In 1941 or 1944, Toksu County's Chinese character name was changed from 'Tuokesu' County to 'Xinhe' County.

Administrative divisions
Towns ( / ):

Townships ( / ):
Payxambabazar (Paixianbaibazha, Peyshenbebazar;  / ), Ogen (Weigan;  / ), Üchqat (Yuqikate;  / ), Tamtoghraq (Tamutuogelake;  / )

Other areas:
 央塔库都片区管委会乡, 新和县轻工业园区生活区, 新和县物流园区生活区, 新和县新材料园区生活区

Climate

Economy 
The economy is based on agriculture and also animal husbandry. The county produces wheat, corn, rice, cotton and melons as well as Parthian fennel and thin-shelled walnuts. Industries include wool-spinning, knitting, and carpet making.

Demographics

As of 2015, 184,399 of the 195,920 residents of the county were Uyghur, 10,901 were Han Chinese and 620 were from other ethnic groups.

As of 1999, 95.01% of the population of the county were Uyghur and 4.81% of the population was Han Chinese.

Transportation
Xinhe is served by the Southern Xinjiang Railway.

Historical maps 
Historical English-language maps including Toksu/Xinhe:

Notes

References

County-level divisions of Xinjiang
Aksu Prefecture